Paz de Ariporo is a town and municipality in the Department of Casanare, Colombia.

An 1856 watercolor by Manuel María Paz is an early depiction of the main square of Paz de Ariporo. At that time, the town was called Moreno, and it served as the capital of Casanare Province.

The town is served by Paz de Ariporo Airport.

References 

Municipalities of Casanare Department